Manohar  is a surname and given name. Notable people with the name include: 

given name
 Manohar Ajgaonkar, Indian politician
 Manohar Das, 17th century Indian Hindu painter
 Manohar Joshi, politician
 Manohar Lal Chibber, soldier
 Manohar Lal Khattar, politician
 Manohar Malgonkar, author
 Manohar Parrikar, politician
 Manohar Shankar Oak, poet
 Murli Manohar Joshi, politician

surname
 Prathima Manohar, social entrepreneur
 Prem Manohar, politician
 Ram Manohar Lohia, Indian independence activist
 Shashank Manohar, Indian cricket administrator
 Sujata Manohar, judge
 Sunanda Murali Manohar, film producer
 V. Manohar, music director, lyricist, film director and actor

Tamil film actors
Ceylon Manohar
Crane Manohar
Lollu Sabha Manohar
R. N. R. Manohar
R. S. Manohar
Suruli Manohar
Surnames of Indian origin
Hindustani-language surnames